Zerendi District is a district of Akmola Region in northern Kazakhstan. The administrative center of the district is the selo of Zerendi. Population:

References

Districts of Kazakhstan
Akmola Region